Triethyl borate is a colorless liquid with the formula B(OCH2CH3)3. It is an ester of boric acid and ethanol.  It has few applications.

It is a weak Lewis acid (AN = 17 as measured by the Gutmann–Beckett method). It burns with a green flame and solutions of it in ethanol are therefore used in special effects and pyrotechnics.

It is formed by the reaction of boric acid and ethanol in the presence of acid catalyst, where it forms according to the equilibrium reaction:

B(OH)3 + 3 C2H5OH  (C2H5O)3B + 3 H2O

In order to increase the rate of forward reaction, the formed water must be removed from reaction media by either azeotropic distillation or adsorption. It is used as a solvent and/or catalyst in preparation of synthetic waxes, resins, paints, and varnishes. It is used as a component of some flame retardants in textile industry and of some welding fluxes.

References

External links
 National Pollutant Inventory - Boron and compounds
 WebBook page for BC6H15O3

Ethyl esters
Borate esters
Solvents